Sleep is an eight-and-a-half hour concept album based around the neuroscience of sleep by German-British composer Max Richter. It was released on September 4, 2015, accompanied by a one-hour version with variations, From Sleep, later remixed as Sleep Remixes.

A documentary Max Richter's Sleep directed by Natalie Johns, released in April 2020 focuses on Richter and Mahr's performances of Sleep in Los Angeles, Berlin, Sydney, and Paris. In March 2023, Richter released Sleep: Tranquility Base EP, with new versions of themes from Sleep.

Background
Sleep was conceived by Richter and his partner, the visual artist Yulia Mahr. It is targeted to fit a full night's rest. Richter talked with American neuroscientist David Eagleman while working on the album's piece to learn about how the brain functions during sleep. Richter stated, "Sleeping is one of the most important things we all do ... We spend a third of our lives asleep and it's always been one of my favourite things, ever since I was a child. ... For me, Sleep is an attempt to see how that space when your conscious mind is on holiday can be a place for music to live."

In the album's credits Richter describes Sleep as an eight-hour lullaby that is meant to be listened to at night. It is scored for piano, cello, two violas, two violins, organ, soprano vocals, synthesizers and electronics. The piece comprises 31 sections in slow tempo. These range from less than three minutes to over thirty, with an average duration of just over fifteen minutes. The sections are variations of five themes.

From Sleep 
The release of Sleep was accompanied by a one-hour album, From Sleep, with seven additional tracks, not present on the eight-hour release, recorded during the same sessions.

From Sleep was promoted by music videos for three tracks: "Dream 13 (Minus Even),"  "Path 5 (Delta)"  and "Dream 3 (In the Midst of My Life)." Additionally, remixed versions of the three tracks, by Mogwai, Clark, Digitonal, Jürgen Müller, Kaitlyn Aurelia and Marconi Union, have been featured on a subsequent remix EP Sleep Remixes, released digitally on February 19, 2016.

Related releases 
New sequences and selections from Sleep were part of a free sleep music and meditation timer mobile app for iOS, introduced to help users sleep, meditate, and focus.

In April 2020, a documentary Max Richter's Sleep was released. Directed by Natalie Johns, the film follows Richter and Mahr performances during the album's tour including an open-air concert in Los Angeles, and performance footage from Berlin, Sydney, and Paris, as well as behind-the-scenes footage.

In March 2023, Sleep: Tranquility Base EP was released, with new versions of themes from Sleep. Titled after the Tranquility Base on the Moon.

Live performances
Sleep was performed in its entirety from midnight to 8:00 AM at the Wellcome Collection in 2015 as the climax of the BBC Radio 3 "Science and Music" weekend. Audience members watched from beds instead of chairs. The performance set records for the longest broadcast and longest live broadcast of a single piece of music. The album was also performed at the Philharmonie de Paris in 2017, and outdoors in Grand Park, Los Angeles in 2018. The Los Angeles performances had 560 beds and were timed so the final movement, "Dream 0 (till break of day)" would occur at dawn.

Critical reception

Sleep received wide acclaim from contemporary music critics. At Metacritic, which assigns a normalized rating out of 100 to reviews from mainstream critics, the album received an average score of 79, based on 7 reviews, which indicates "generally favorable reviews".

Jon Falcone gave the album a very positive review, stating, "Sleep implores you for companionship and bleeds into itself as it bleeds into the listener. Typing while the fizz of ‘Never Fade Into Nothingness’ plays makes transforms Word documents in an epic dance of black pixels on white light, binary marks scratching into a too-bright glassy reflection. Walking while the echo-drenched monastic vocals of ‘Non-Eternal’ exposes that the world we occupy is haunted is exhilarating and avoiding awkward work colleagues as ‘If You Came This Way’ patters out its motif, that dangles held violin notes over electronic burbles, is to experience the sound of solace itself."

Grayson Haver Currin of Pitchfork Media gave the album a positive review, stating, "At its best, Sleep feels like compositionally rigorous new age music. It’s a place in which you can settle for a while, with or without a pillow, and emerge only when you are ready to rejoin the restive world." Currin was also slightly critical of the release, stating, "Sleep, then, is simply too didactic as a name. It’s a command that tells us how to enjoy something that clearly has other uses. That handle, combined with Richter’s conceit, has turned the record into a kind of clickbait story, too, which seems entirely antithetical to Richter’s point."

Commercial performance
As of February 2020 Sleep had peaked at position 44 in the UK album charts, with sales of 40,151. As of July 2020, Sleep had almost 500 million streams.

Track listing

Sleep 

 The digital release treats the above as one single piece, segueing between each track. On CD, the last songs on each disc, "whose name is written on water", "Dream 11 (whisper music)", "Patterns (lux)", "Chorale/glow", "Song/echo" "if you came this way" and "Sublunar", are lightly extended in order to account for the physical limitations of the medium; these pieces are extended by up to 30 seconds to account for the lack of transitions into the next track.

From Sleep 

Rough Trade Shops Special Edition CD2

Personnel
Main personnel
 Max Richter – composer, electronics, liner notes, mixing, organ, piano, primary artist, producer, quotation author, synthesizer
 American Contemporary Music Ensemble – strings (ensemble)
 Grace Davidson – vocals (soprano)
 Brian Snow – cello
 Clarice Jensen – cello
 Caleb Burhans – viola
 Ben Russell – violin
 Yuki Numata Resnick – violin

Additional personnel
 Christian Badzura – project manager
 Tom Bailey – assistant engineer
 Tim Cooper – liner notes
 Rupert Coulson – engineer, mixing
 David Eagleman – liner notes
 Merle Kersten – art direction
 Yulia Mahr – executive producer
 Mandy Parnell – mastering
 Anna-Lena Rodewald – project manager
 Mike Terry – photography
 Alejandro Venguer – engineer
 Mareike Walter – design

Charts
Sleep

From Sleep

Certifications

See also
 Long Ambients 1: Calm. Sleep. (2016) and Long Ambients 2 (2019), ambient albums by Moby
Music and sleep

References

2015 albums
Deutsche Grammophon albums
Max Richter albums
Concept albums
Sleep